The Huawei Mate 10, Huawei Mate 10 Pro and Huawei Mate 10 Lite are Android smartphones designed and marketed by Huawei as part of the Huawei Mate series. There is also a Mate 10 Porsche design, which has 256Gb of storage but is otherwise identical to the Mate 10 Pro. They were first released on 16 October 2017.  Versus the predecessor Mate 9, the Mate 10 pro flagship phone has a faster processor with an integrated neural processing unit, a slightly larger OLED screen (6.0") with a taller 18:9 aspect ratio, a significantly longer battery life and a glass back construction (but free of wireless charging).  Chinese and international models are available in dual SIM configuration. It comes with Android 8 and a newer version of Huawei's EMUI interface. All Mate 10 models are unlocked and GSM only.    Huawei phones, including the Mate series, are not sold or financed through U.S. carriers due to pressure from U.S. intelligence agencies, though they are available from independent and online retailers.

The Mate 10 series was supplanted by the Mate 20 series as the flagship in October 2018.

Specifications
The Mate 10 series is powered by Huawei's all-new AI-focused processor, the Kirin 970. Kirin 970 is a 64-bit octa-core 2.36/1.8 GHz mobile ARM LTE SoC with a 12-core Mali G72 GPU and an onboard Neural processing unit (NPU).  
On the Kirin 970, the NPU takes over tasks like scanning and translating words in pictures taken with Microsoft's Translator.

The Mate 10 is backed by 4 GB of RAM coupled with 64 GB storage, while the Mate 10 Pro is backed by either 4 GB RAM and 64 GB storage, or 6 GB RAM and 128 GB storage. The most expensive model, the Porsche Design gets 6 GB RAM and 256 GB storage. In China, you can get the Huawei Mate 10 with 6 GB RAM and 128 GB storage just like the Pro model although the rest of the world can buy it through online stores.

Both phones feature a near-bezeless display with the Mate 10 having 81.61% screen to body ratio while the Mate 10 Pro having 81.79% screen to body ratio. The Mate 10 has a typical 16:9 aspect ratio, while the Mate 10 Pro has the new 18:9 ratio. A 5.9-inch LCD display panel with RGBW arrangement is used in the Mate 10, and a 6-inch OLED panel made by BOE in the Mate 10 Pro. Surprisingly, the Mate 10 has a higher resolution than the larger Mate 10 Pro (1440p to 1080p).

The phones' body is made of 3D glass with aluminum frame. Both front and back of the phone is covered with Gorilla Glass 5. Despite a glass back, wireless charging is not supported.

Huawei once again partnered with Leica to engineer the dual-lens camera in the Mate 10 series. The rear camera is a dual lens 12 MP RGB sensor with a f/1.6 aperture and a monochrome 20 MP sensor with the same f/1.6 aperture. Only the RGB camera is supported by optical image stabilization. Due to this dual-lens camera setup, the camera is capable of creating bokeh shots and it is adjustable even after taking the shot.  The front camera is an 8 MP RGB camera.

Both phones have a large 4,000 mAh battery with fast charging. Huawei claims that the phone can be charged from 1 to 20 percent in 10 minutes, and from 1 to 58 percent in 30 minutes.

Ports on the Mate 10 include a 3.5mm headphone jack, and a USB-C charging and data transfer port. However, the headphone jack is not present on the Mate 10 Pro, which, instead has IP67 water and dust resistance while the Mate 10 only has IP53 rating.  The Mate 10 pro also has an IR blaster, so can be used as the remote control for TVs, etc.

The phones also come in single sim (U.S.) and dual sim (China and Europe, at least) 4G/4G configurations.  However, the dual sim configurations are DSDS (Dual Sim/Dual Standby) meaning the user must specify in settings which SIM can be used to send/receive calls or browse the internet.  The other SIM will be inactivated.

The Mate 10 features expandable storage via a micro-SD card supporting up to 256 Gb (uses SIM 2 slot).  The Pro models do not have expandable storage.

The Mate 10 has a real Home button/fingerprint scanner on the bottom of the front bezel; the Pro moves the fingerprint sensor to the back and vanishes the Home button.

All the Mate 10 series phones are factory unlocked, but are GSM only - they do not support CDMA used by U.S. carriers like Verizon,  Sprint and U.S. Cellular (the TL00 and AL00 Chinese models support CDMA 800 MHz, but are locked to China Telecom carrier). Because there are differences in GSM bands supported by the models, all models may not work on all carriers/networks, if they are attempted to be used outside their designated distribution areas.

Huawei Mate 10 Lite

Huawei also released a "Lite" version of the Mate 10 with budget features and pricing ranking below the midrange P and Honor series phones: 2.36/1.7 GHz Kirin 659 with Mali T830 MP2 GPU, with about half the performance of the Kirin 970 on the flagship models and roughly comparable to the older P8 model. There is only one memory/storage configuration, 4GB/64GB. The phone comes with a 5.9 inch IPS LCD display with a resolution of 1080x2160 and an 18:9 aspect ratio. It has a 3340 mAh battery, a 16 megapixel rear camera, and runs on the older Android 7.0/EMUI 5.1 software. It measures 156.20 x 75.00 x 7.50 (height x width x thickness) and weighs 164.00 grams. The Huawei Mate 10 Lite may come in single SIM or dual SIM (GSM and GSM) configuration. It is also known as the Huawei Nova 2i in Malaysia, Huawei Maimang 6 in China, and Huawei Honor 9i in India.

Software

The phones run on Android 8 "Oreo", with Huawei's own custom skin, EMUI 8.0 on top of it. The previous EMUI version was 5.1. Huawei decided to upgrade it to EMUI 8.0 to match the latest Android version number, which is 8.0 as well. It has some new features, notably the desktop mode called "Easy Projection", which is a custom desktop interface, similar to Samsung DeX, which appears when connecting the phone to a display via an HDMI-to-USB-C cable.

Models
The phones have at least 6 model designations, A09, AL00, TL00, L09, L29, and LOAC. The prefix BLA- designates a Mate 10 Pro, ALP- designates a Mate 10 and RNE- designates a Mate 10 Lite. Each model may come in two configurations for the Mate 10 pro, 4GB/64GB or 6GB/128GB.  The Mate 10 Pro A09/L29 (Porsche) has a 6GB/256GB configuration.  The BLA-LOAC model is an alternate name for the BLA-A09 model sold through special OEM arrangements at U.S. retailers like Best Buy.  The A09/LOAC models are for U.S. distribution, the AL00 models are for China, the L09 and L29 models are for Europe and international distribution.  The TL00 model appears to be a limited distribution Himalayan model closely resembling the AL00 Chinese models. The L29 models are dual-sim variants of the L09/A09 models; the A00 models are also dual sim.  There are some differences between the A09/LOAC and Lx9 models in GSM bands supported. There are 6 models of Mate 10 Lite, L01, L02, L03, L21, L22, and L23; L0x models are single SIM and L2x models are dual SIM; otherwise the Mate 10 Lite has a fixed configuration and the models differ only in geographic area of distribution and the local GSM frequencies supported there.

The Mate 10 is not marketed or sold in the U.S, though it is available online from international sellers. Also, no dual 
SIM models are sold in the U.S.

Markets and release dates
The Kirin 970 SoC which powers the Mate 10 series was first unveiled at the 2017 Berlin IFA in early Sept.  The Mate 10 series was initially released to select markets on Oct. 16, 2017, followed by U.K. and Europe in late 2017, then the United States on Feb. 18, 2018.

Unlocking (rooting) the Mate 10/Pro
While it was originally intended to be an OEM/developer feature only, prior to May 24, 2018, Huawei freely supplied a bootloader unlock code to enable users/developers to root their devices.  The URL to obtain the unlock code no longer exists. The company's announcement said: "Announcement:  To provide better user experience and avoid issues caused by ROM flashing, the unlock code application service will be stopped for all products launched after 2018-5-24. For products released prior to this date, the service will be stopped 60 days after this announcement. Thank you for your understanding. We will continue to provide you with quality services.  2018-5-24 Huawei Device Co. Ltd." This was followed in June with an OTA named Patch01 that caused rooted phones to go into a bootloop until the original unrooted image was flashed. This image cannot be rooted.

Performance
The performance of the Mate 10 and Mate 10 Pro with identical CPU and GPU and clock frequencies, are very close.  Due to its lower screen resolution, the Mate 10 Pro has a slight advantage especially in graphics intensive applications.  The performance of the Mate 10 Lite, with CPU and GPU 2-3 generations older, falls far below that of the flagship models.

Though the Mate 10 scores top the list of Android phones at Oct. 2017 release date, they fall well short of the A11 Fusion powered iPhone 8, 8+ and X, as well as the Snapdragon 845 powered devices released just a few months later.

Special note: the official Geekbench testing site excludes the Mate 10 and Mate 20 models other than the Lite models from the published results because it claims these models run the benchmarks in a special benchmark mode which does not reflect real world performance.  Predecessor phones like the Mate 9 and P10 are not affected; only products released from 2Q 2017 and later.  The list of benchmarks affected is extensive: Geekbench, GFXbench, 3Dmark, Antutu, Quadrant, and others. These were not subtle differences, either, with results up to 47 percent higher than they were with private test variants Huawei couldn't catch. In some cases, the Mate 10 performed poorer on these internal benchmarks than the Kirin 960/Mali G71 powered Mate 9.

The company has since claimed that AI processes are responsible for allocating resources when heavy workloads are encountered.  However, private benchmarks identical to the public ones except for the names of the apps, and embedded strings containing the names, show radically different performance.  The company has stated that it will make 'Performance mode' available to ordinary users.  It is not clear that GPU turbo (see below) is the putative performance mode.

GPU turbo
In Aug. 2018, Huawei introduced a 'GPU turbo' mode as a software only upgrade and it is available at least for the Mate 10, Mate 10 Pro and Mate 10 Porsche design models.  GPU turbo mode, the company claims, eliminates GPU throttling by using AI paradigms to predict invariant portions of the screen to reduce rendering effort and power consumption. The company does not claim that GPU turbo mode increases the maximum frame rate(s). The drawbacks for this technology are that it is per device (SoC) and per game - the device must be trained or tuned for each game and the profile data stored on the device. So far, only two games have been optimized for GPU turbo: PUBG and Legends: Bang, Bang.  The company has also announced that GPU turbo will not be released to the United States market.

Competitors
The Mate 10 series came out in the same month as the Apple iPhone 8 and iPhone 10 and were positioned as direct competitors of these as well as the Samsung Galaxy S8 series released in April, 2017, though released at slightly lower price points. Other major competitors in the same timeframe were the OnePlus 5 and Google's Pixel 2 series.

Reception
The Huawei Mate 10 series received mostly positive reviews, especially regarding the camera feature. DxOMark gave it an overall 97 points, similar to the more expensive iPhone X and only 1 point behind the Google Pixel 2.  Most reviewers praised the long battery life, a result of the 4000mAh battery, but criticized the heavily skinned EMUI software and the lack of certain features such as WLAN without MIMO, Bluetooth 5.0, and wireless charging for both models.

The Huawei Mate 10 Pro's lack of QHD+ resolution, storage expansion, and a headphone jack also received some criticism from reviewers. However it was praised in other aspects like including a bright and accurate-color OLED display, LTE Cat. 18, Dual-VoLTE, Dual-SIM, aptX HD, good performance, very fast quick-charge technology, water and dust proofing (IP67), high build quality, exact location determination and excellent voice quality.

See also
Huawei P10
Comparison of smartphones
List of Huawei phones

References

External links
Huawei Mate 10
Huawei Mate 10 Pro
Huawei Mate 10 Porsche Design

Android (operating system) devices
Mobile phones introduced in 2017
Huawei mobile phones
Mobile phones with multiple rear cameras
Mobile phones with 4K video recording
Discontinued smartphones
Mobile phones with infrared transmitter